Acupicta bubases is a species of butterfly belonging to the lycaenid family. It was named by Hewitson in 1875. It is found in  Southeast Asia - Peninsular Malaya, Borneo (A. b. matsudai Okubo, 2007).

Subspecies
Acupicta bubases bubases (Peninsular Malaysia)
Acupicta bubases matsudai Okubo, 2007 (Borneo: Sabah)

References

External links

"Acupicta Eliot, 1973" at Markku Savela's Lepidoptera and Some Other Life Forms. Retrieved June 6, 2017.

bubases
Butterflies of Asia
Butterflies described in 1875
Taxa named by William Chapman Hewitson